The Randall Davey House, on Upper Canyon Rd. in Santa Fe, New Mexico, was built in 1847.  It was listed on the National Register of Historic Places in 1970.  The listing included two contributing buildings.

It was a home of artist Randall Davey, and is now the Randall Davey Audubon Center & Sanctuary.

It was built as a sawmill, the first in the New Mexico territory, "by the United States Army Quartermaster in
order to provide lumber needed for the construction of nearby Fort Marcy. The sawmill was powered by water from the Santa Fe River.

A mortgage on the property was owned by Colonel Ceran St. Vrain, trapper and trader from St. Louis, who eventually obtained the property for $500 at a public auction in 1852. "The property at that time, according to contemporary legal documents, consisted of 'one gristmill, one circular sawmill with extra gearing; the building for said sawmill is a good two story building, built for that purpose. Also two dwelling houses and one stable.'"

References

External links

sawmills in the United States
grinding mills in New Mexico
grinding mills on the National Register of Historic Places
bird sanctuaries of the United States
National Register of Historic Places in Santa Fe County, New Mexico
buildings and structures completed in 1847